Librem is a line of computers manufactured by Purism, SPC featuring free (libre) software. The laptop line is designed to protect privacy and freedom by providing no non-free (proprietary) software in the operating system or kernel, avoiding the Intel Active Management Technology, and gradually freeing and securing firmware. Librem laptops feature hardware kill switches for the microphone, webcam, Bluetooth and Wi-Fi.

Models

Laptops

Librem 13, Librem 15 and Librem 14
In 2014, Purism launched a crowdfunding campaign on Crowd Supply to fund the creation and production of the Librem 15 laptop, conceived as a modern alternative to existing open-source hardware laptops, all of which used older hardware. The  in the name refers to its 15-inch screen size. The campaign succeeded after extending the original campaign, and the laptops were shipped to backers. In a second revision of the laptop, hardware kill switches for the camera, microphone, Wi-Fi, and Bluetooth were added.

After the successful launch of the Librem 15, Purism created another campaign on Crowd Supply for a 13-inch laptop called the Librem 13, which also came with hardware kill switches similar to those on the Librem 15v2. The campaign was again successful and the laptops were shipped to customers.

Purism announced in December 2016 that it would start shipping from inventory rather than building to order with the new batches of Librem 15 and 13.

, Purism has one laptop model in production, the Librem 14 (version 1, US$1,370).

Comparison of laptops

Librem Mini
The Librem Mini is a small form factor desktop computer, which began shipping in June 2020.

Librem 5

On August 24, 2017, Purism started a crowdfunding campaign for the Librem 5, a smartphone aimed to run 100% free software, which would "[focus] on security by design and privacy protection by default". Purism claimed that the phone would become "the world's first ever IP-native mobile handset, using end-to-end encrypted decentralized communication." Purism cooperated with KDE and GNOME in its development of Librem 5.

Security features of the Librem 5 include separation of the CPU from the baseband processor, which, according to Linux Magazine, makes the Librem 5 unique in comparison to other mobile phones. The Librem 5 also features hardware kill switches for Wi-Fi and Bluetooth communication and the phone's camera, microphone, and baseband processor.

The default operating system for the Librem 5 is Purism's PureOS, a Debian GNU/Linux derivative. The operating system uses a new user interface called Phosh, based on Wayland, wlroots, GTK and GNOME middleware. It is planned that Phosh/Plasma Mobile, Ubuntu Touch, and postmarketOS can also be installed on the phone.

The release of the Librem 5 has been postponed several times. In September 2018, Purism announced that the launch date of Librem 5 would be moved from January to April 2019, because of two hardware bugs and the holiday season in Europe and North America. The Librem 5's DevKits for software developers were shipped in December 2018. The launch date was later postponed to the third quarter because of the necessity of further CPU tests. and on September 24, 2019, Purism announced that the first batch of Librem 5 phones had started shipping. The finished version of the Librem 5, known as "Evergreen", was finally shipped on November 18, 2020.

Librem Server
The Librem server is a rack mounted server, released to the public in December 2019.

Librem Key
Announced on 20 September 2018, the Librem Key is a hardware USB security token with multiple features, including integration with a tamper-evident Heads BIOS, that ensures a Librem laptop Basic Input/Output System (BIOS) was not maliciously altered since the last laptop launch. Also a one-time password storage with 3x HMAC-based One-time Password algorithm (HOTP) (RFC 4226) and 15 x Time-based One-time Password algorithm (TOTP) (RFC 6238) and an integrated password manager (16 entries), 40 kbit/s true random number generator, and a tamper-resistant smart card. The key supports type A USB 2.0, has dimensions of 48 x 19 x 7 mm, and weights 6 g.

Operating system

Initially planning to preload its Librem laptops with the Trisquel operating system, Purism eventually moved off the Trisquel platform to rebase onto Debian for the 2.0 release of its PureOS Linux operating system. As an alternative to PureOS, Librem laptops are purchasable with Qubes OS preinstalled. In December 2017 the Free Software Foundation added PureOS to its list of endorsed GNU/Linux distributions.

BIOS
In 2015, Purism began research to port the Librem 13 to coreboot but the effort was initially stalled. By the end of the year, a coreboot developer completed an initial port of the Librem 13 and submitted it for review. In December 2016, hardware enablement developer Youness Alaoui joined Purism and was tasked to complete the coreboot port for the original Librem 13 and prepare a port for the second revision of the device. Since summer 2017, new Librem laptops are shipped with coreboot as their standard BIOS, and updates are available for all older models.

Purism calls a collection of below mentioned six components, involved in the boot process, as PureBoot:

 Neutralized and Disabled Intel Management Engine.
 The coreboot.
 A Trusted Platform Module (TPM) chip.
 Heads, which tamper-evident features to detect when the BIOS or important boot files have been modified. 
 Librem Key, Purism's USB security token
 Multi-factor authentication that unlocks disk encryption using the Librem Key

PureBoot protects the users from various attacks like theft, BIOS Malware and Kernel Rootkits, vulnerabilities and malicious code in the Intel Management Engine and interdiction.

See also 

 Linux adoption
 System76
 Pine64
 Coreboot

References

Computer hardware
Computer security companies
GNOME Mobile
Linux-based devices
Open-source hardware
Smartphones